Sonterra is a planned community and census-designated place (CDP) in Williamson County, Texas, United States. It was first listed as a CDP prior to the 2020 census.

It is in the northern part of the county, bordered to the north by the city of Jarrell. Interstate 35 forms part of the western border of the community, with access from Exit 275 (Sonterra Boulevard). I-35 leads north  to Temple and south  to Austin, the state capital.

References 

Populated places in Williamson County, Texas
Census-designated places in Williamson County, Texas
Census-designated places in Texas